Massachusetts became the first state to officially issue vehicle license plates in 1903. New York continued to require their residents to register their vehicles with the state, but the owner had to supply their own license plate. Connecticut, Minnesota, New Jersey, Pennsylvania, and the District of Columbia all began to require vehicle registration with the vehicle owners also supplying their own plate. Each of the other states of the United States of America plus several of its territories did not require or issue license plates during 1903.

Passenger baseplates
In the table below, a light green background indicates that the owner of the vehicle was required to provide their own license plates. These plates are called "prestate" by most collectors. In the prestate era many states only provided the license plate number on a small disc or on paper, and the owner was required to have their license plate(s) made. These early license plates were created from kits that could be purchased at a hardware store, may have been available from automobile clubs or associations, they were forged by blacksmiths or other tradesmen, or the owner may have made their own plate with whatever materials they had on hand. Prestate plates were made from a variety of materials, but most often were made of leather, steel, or wood.

See also

Antique vehicle registration
Electronic license plate
Motor vehicle registration
Vehicle license

References

External links

1903 in the United States
1903